Pedro Arrupe Training Center for Leaders and Educators (Arrupe Center) was founded by the Society of Jesus in 1997 to train teachers according to the principles of Ignatian Pedagogy and multiculturalism. Headquartered in Warsaw, Poland, its work has extended to formation of leaders of NGOs and of educational institutions throughout Poland and abroad. It has a staff of seven along with more than 40 trainers.

References  

Jesuit development centres
Organizations established in 1997
Research institutes in Poland
Social science institutes
Cultural promotion organizations